Xenophilus (fl. second half of the 4th century BC) was a Macedonian military figure under Alexander the Great. 

As Alexander was preparing to move into Persis, he left a garrison in Susa, appointed Xenophilus as its garrison commander (phrourarch), and reconfirmed Abulites as satrap of Susiana, "holding civil jurisdiction". Xenophilus replaced the Persian commandant of Susa, Mazarus. During the Wars of the Diadochi he defended Susa against the forces of Seleucus I. What became of Xenophilus is unknown, but it is likely that Antigonus either kept him in honorable detention (as appears to be the case with Peucestas) or eliminated him.

References

Sources
Who's Who in the Age of Alexander the Great - Waldemar Heckel 
 
 

Phrourarchs of Alexander the Great
4th-century BC Macedonians
Year of birth unknown
Year of death unknown